Section 33 of the Canadian Charter of Rights and Freedoms is part of the Constitution of Canada. It is commonly known as the notwithstanding clause ( or ), sometimes referred to as the override power, and it allows Parliament or provincial legislatures to temporarily override sections 2 and 7–15 of the Charter.

Text

The section states:

Function

The Parliament of Canada, a provincial legislature or a territorial legislature may declare that one of its laws or part of a law applies temporarily ("notwithstanding") countermanding sections of the Charter, thereby nullifying any judicial review by overriding the Charter protections for a limited period of time. This is done by including a section in the law clearly specifying which rights have been overridden. A simple majority vote in any of Canada's 14 jurisdictions may suspend the core rights of the Charter. However, the rights to be overridden must be either a "fundamental right" guaranteed by Section 2 (such as freedom of expression, religion, and association), a "legal right" guaranteed by Sections 7–14 (such as rights to liberty and freedom from search and seizures and cruel and unusual punishment) or a Section 15 "equality right". Other rights such as section 6 mobility rights, democratic rights, and language rights are inviolable.

Such a declaration lapses after five years or a lesser time specified in the clause, although the legislature may re-enact the clause any number of times. The rationale behind having a five-year expiry date is that it is also the maximum amount of time the Parliament or legislature may sit before an election must be called. Therefore, if the people wish for the law to be repealed, they have the right to elect new representatives who would have the power to do so. (The provisions of the Charter that deal with elections and democratic representation (§§3–5) are not among those that can be overridden with the notwithstanding clause (§§2,7–15).)

The notwithstanding clause reflects the hybrid character of Canadian political institutions. In effect, it protects the British tradition of parliamentary supremacy under the American-style system of written constitutional rights and strong courts introduced in 1982. Former Prime Minister Jean Chrétien also described it as a tool that could guard against a Supreme Court ruling legalizing hate speech and child pornography as freedom of expression.

History

The idea for the clause was proposed by Peter Lougheed as suggested by Merv Leitch. The clause was a compromise reached during the debate over the new constitution in the early 1980s. Among the provinces' major complaints with the Charter was its effect of shifting power from elected officials to the judiciary, giving the courts the final word. Section 33, in conjunction with the limitations clause in section 1, was intended to give provincial legislators more leverage to pass law. Prime Minister Pierre Trudeau at first strongly objected to the clause, but eventually consented to its inclusion under pressure from the provincial premiers.

The clause was included as part of what is known as "The Kitchen Accord". At the end of a conference on the constitution that was poised to end in deadlock, Jean Chrétien, the federal justice minister, as well as Roy McMurtry and Roy Romanow, both provincial ministers, met in a kitchen in the Government Conference Centre in Ottawa and sowed the seeds for a deal. This compromise ultimately caused two major changes to the constitution package: the first was that the Charter would include the "notwithstanding clause", and the second was an agreed-upon amending formula. They then worked through the night with consultations from different premiers, and agreement from almost everybody. However, they notably excluded René Lévesque, the premier of Quebec, in the negotiations. At any rate, he refused to agree to the deal, and ultimately the Quebec government declined to endorse the constitutional amendment. Chrétien would later say on the notwithstanding clause, "Canada probably wouldn't have had any Charter without it."

In exchange for agreeing to the Notwithstanding Clause, Trudeau declined to remove the federal powers of disallowance and reservation from the draft Constitution.

When it was introduced, Alan Borovoy, general counsel to the Canadian Civil Liberties Association at the time, addressed concerns that the override was susceptible to abuse by stating that “[p]olitical difficulty” would be a “reasonable safeguard for the Charter”.

According to Chrétien, in 1992, Trudeau blamed him for the notwithstanding clause, saying "you gave them that". Chrétien replied, "Sorry, Pierre. I recommended it. You gave it."

During the January 9, 2006, party leaders' debate for the 2006 federal election, Prime Minister Paul Martin unexpectedly pledged that his Liberal government, if returned, would support a constitutional amendment to prevent the federal government from invoking section 33, and challenged Conservative leader Stephen Harper to agree. This sparked a debate as to how the notwithstanding clause can be amended. Some argued that the amending formula required the federal government to gain the approval of at least seven provinces with at least half the national population (the standard procedure). Others argued that since the proposal would only limit the federal Parliament's powers, Parliament could make the change alone.

Comparison with other human rights instruments
Constitutional scholar Peter Hogg has remarked that the notwithstanding clause "seems to be a uniquely Canadian invention". The United States Constitution gives no such powers to the states (see: nullification), but Article III, sect. 2 does authorize the Congress to remove jurisdiction from the federal courts. Not since World War II has Congress mustered the requisite majority.

However, the concept of the notwithstanding clause was not created with the Charter. The presence of the clause makes the Charter similar to the Canadian Bill of Rights (1960), which, under section 2, states that "an Act of the Parliament" may declare that a law "shall operate notwithstanding the Canadian Bill of Rights". A primary difference is that the Bill of Rights' notwithstanding clause could be used to invalidate "any" right, not just specified clauses as with the Charter. The Saskatchewan Human Rights Code (1979), the Quebec Charter of Human Rights and Freedoms (1977), and the Alberta Bill of Rights (1972) also contain devices like the notwithstanding clause.

Outside Canada, Israel added a device similar to the notwithstanding clause to one of its Basic Laws in 1992. However, this power could be used only in respect of the right to work.

In Victoria, Australia, section 31 of the Victorian Charter of Human Rights and Responsibilities fulfils a similar purpose.ABC AM radio program, 21 December 2005, according to transcript 

The uncodified constitution of the United Kingdom has an implicit equivalent of a notwithstanding clause: following the doctrine of parliamentary sovereignty, the courts have no power to declare primary legislation invalid on constitutional grounds, including on grounds of incompatibility with the European Convention on Human Rights. The Human Rights Act 1998 requires legislation to be interpreted in a way compatible with the Convention if possible, but they must nonetheless enforce any primary legislation that they cannot so interpret. This does not apply to secondary legislation or devolved legislation, which may be ultra vires if incompatible.

Uses of the notwithstanding clause

Four provinces and one territory have passed laws invoking the notwithstanding clause. The clause has been invoked most frequently by Quebec, including the blanket application of the clause to every law from 1982-1985, a French-only sign law in 1988, a law prohibiting state-affiliated employees from wearing religious coverings in 2019, and a law strengthening the use of French in 2022. Saskatchewan passed a back-to-work law invoking the clause in 1986, and passed a law in 2018 (never brought into force) invoking the clause to permit the government to pay for non-Catholics to attend publicly-funded Catholic schools. Alberta passed a law invoking the clause in 2000 to define marriage as "between a man and a woman"; this law was effectively declared ultra vires by the Supreme Court of Canada because only the federal Parliament can define marriage. In 2021, Ontario passed a law invoking the clause to increase the time period during which third-party groups must limit their activities in the lead-up to an election. Yukon invoked the clause in 1982, but this law was never brought into force. 

The federal Parliament has never introduced legislation invoking the clause. 

Alberta
Compensation for forced sterilization (1998)
In 1998, Alberta introduced, but later abandoned, a bill that would attempt to use the notwithstanding clause to limit lawsuits against the government for past forced sterilizations approved by the Alberta Eugenics Board before the Sexual Sterilization Act was repealed.

Same-sex marriage (2000)
In March 2000, the Legislature of Alberta passed Bill 202, which amended the province's Marriage Act to include an opposite-sex-only definition of marriage as well as the notwithstanding clause in order to insulate the definition from Charter challenges. However, a legislature may only use the "notwithstanding clause" on legislation it would otherwise have the authority to enact, and the Supreme Court of Canada ruled in 2004 in Reference re Same-Sex Marriage that the definition of marriage is within the exclusive domain of the Parliament of Canada, thus finding Bill 202 ultra vires, or beyond the constitutional powers of the Alberta Legislature.

Other discussions of its use in Alberta
There were also discussions to invoke the notwithstanding clause following the Supreme Court of Canada's 1998 decision in Vriend v Alberta, but were resisted by Premier Ralph Klein at the time.

New Brunswick
Mandatory vaccinations (2019)
On November 22, 2019, Education Minister Dominic Cardy introduced a bill, known as Bill 39, in the Legislative Assembly of New Brunswick to end non-medical exemptions to vaccinations in school children, which includes invoking the notwithstanding clause. Cardy said this was to pre-empt any court and charter challenges to the bill by "an organized, well-financed lobby out there that's intent on derailing efforts to protect vulnerable children". The use of the notwithstanding clause was removed from the bill in June 2020, before the bill was ultimately defeated in a free vote at third reading in the legislature.

Ontario
Municipal elections (2018)
In August 2018, the government of Ontario passed the Better Local Government Act, which, among other things, ordered the Toronto City Council to change its electoral ward boundaries for the 2018 municipal election to match the boundaries used for federal and provincial electoral ridings, thus reducing the number of wards from 47 to 25. Premier of Ontario Doug Ford stated that the council had "failed to act on the critical issues facing the city", and claimed cost savings of $25 million over the next four years. The bill was controversial for both its intent and its timing, as it came in the midst of a municipal election campaign. The electoral boundaries had already been realigned for the 2018 election to expand it from 44 to 47 wards, by consolidating several existing wards and adding new ones.

On September 10, 2018, the act was struck down by Superior Court Justice Edward Belobaba as unconstitutional, ruling that the larger wards infringed voters' rights to an election whose outcome provides "effective representation", and that unilaterally changing electoral boundaries in the middle of a campaign infringed on candidates' freedom of expression. Shortly afterward, Ford announced his intent to table legislation authorizing an invocation of the notwithstanding clause to overturn the ruling, which, if passed, would have been the first use of the notwithstanding clause in Ontario. However, on September 19, the Court of Appeal for Ontario granted a stay of the Superior Court's decision, allowing the province to again implement a 25-ward structure for the City of Toronto. During the oral argument for that case, the counsel for the attorney general stated that the provincial government would not proceed with the legislation to invoke the notwithstanding clause if the stay was granted. Justice Belobaba's ruling was ultimately overturned 3-2 by the Court of Appeal in a full hearing. The Court of Appeal ruling was upheld by the Supreme Court of Canada in 2021; in a 5-4 ruling, a majority of the Court ruled that Ontario's Better Local Government Act violated neither freedom of expression nor the unwritten constitutional principle of democracy.

Third-party political advertising (2021)
In early 2021, the Ontario government passed the Protecting Ontario Elections Act, 2021, which restricted the ability of private sector organizations from running political advertisements outside of election periods. In June, The Ontario Superior Court found the law to violate freedom of expression, and struck down those sections of the law. The Ontario government then passed the Protecting Elections and Defending Democracy Act, 2021 to enact the restrictions using the Notwithstanding Clause. 

In March 2023, the Court of Appeal for Ontario struck down the law again, this time for violating a section of the charter not protected by the notwithstanding clause relating to voter participation.

Education worker labour rights (2022)
On November 3, 2022, the government of Ontario passed a bill that imposed a contract on Ontario education workers who were part of the Canadian Union of Public Employees to prevent them from striking; the bill used the Notwithstanding Clause in an attempt to prohibit the union from a constitutional challenge regarding the freedom to associate. Despite this, the education workers still went on strike.

Quebec
Blanket application (1982–1985)
After the Charter came into force in 1982, the Parti Québécois government in Quebec inserted wording pursuant to section 33 into every law passed by the National Assembly of Quebec, as well as retroactively amending every existing law, in an attempt to ensure that no provincial law could ever be challenged in the courts on grounds in the relevant Charter sections. This stopped in 1985, when the newly elected Quebec Liberals discontinued the practice. The Quebec Liberals did successfully invoke the notwithstanding clause to apply to a number of pieces of legislation pertaining to education and pensions between 1986 and 1992. Many of these uses of the notwithstanding clause were subsequently re-enacted.

The way the Quebec legislature deployed the clause in the late 1980s diminished public respect in the rest of the country for section 33. Due to the mass opposition that its use, or even threatened use, as in the case of Alberta (listed above), would evoke, the act of invoking the notwithstanding clause would be more politically costly even than had always been apprehended, according to some.Chrétien, My Years as Prime Minister, pp. 392–393.

Sign laws (1988)
On December 21, 1988, after the decision of the Supreme Court of Canada in Ford v Quebec (AG), the National Assembly of Quebec employed section 33 and the equivalent section 52 of the Quebec Charter of Human Rights and Freedoms in their Bill 178. This allowed Quebec to continue to restrict the posting of certain commercial signs in languages other than French. In 1993, after the law was criticized by the United Nations Human Rights Committee, the Bourassa government had the National Assembly rewrite the law to conform to Supreme Court's interpretation of the right to freedom of expression in section 2(b) Charter, and the notwithstanding clause was removed.

Wearing of religious symbols by public servants (2019)
On March 28, 2019, the recently elected Coalition Avenir Québec (CAQ) government applied the notwithstanding clause in Bill 21 (An Act respecting the Laicity of the State). The bill was passed on June 16, 2019, and prevents public workers in positions of authority from wearing religious symbols. It also prevents people from receiving public services with their faces covered.

French language requirements for multiple sectors (2021)

The stated goal of Bill 96 was “to affirm that the only official language of Québec is French. It also affirms that French is the common language of the Québec nation.” Bill 96 was adopted on May 24, 2022, with 78 MNAs in favour and 29 against (from the Liberal Party and Parti Québécois). Instead of applying the notwithstanding clause only to parts of Bill 96, the Coalition Avenir Québec government applied it to the entire Bill.

The amendment expanded the requirements of businesses to communicate in French. Previously, businesses with more than 50 employees faced additional responsibilities to have the common language be French. The amendment lowered that minimum from 50 employees to 25.

Employers may not require knowledge of a language other than French during “recruitment, hiring, transfer or promotion,” unless they can show the additional language is necessary and they took “all reasonable means to avoid imposing such a requirement." 

The amendment also granted search and seizure laws to the Office québécois de la langue française (OQLF) and the Minister Responsible for the French Language. Section 111 describes how the OQLF may “enter at any reasonable hour any place, other than a dwelling house,” where a business conducts activity or holds documents. The amendment requires that anyone present with access to a device or data must provide that access to the inspectors; the inspectors also may seize devices and data for future examination and reproduction; no warrant is needed.

The amendment also impacted health care and social services, limiting service in English to "historic anglophones" or "," immigrants, refugees, or asylum seekers who have been in Quebec for less than 6 months, or "where health, public safety or the principles of natural justice so require." The Minister of Justice and French Language, Simon Jolin-Barrette, said that access would not change for English speakers, but critics suggested that the law is unclear, especially since unlike in the Act respecting the laicity of the State, no special exemption is explicit.

Saskatchewan
Back-to-work order (1986)
In 1986, the Legislature of Saskatchewan enacted a law, the SGEU Dispute Settlement Act, in which workers were ordered back to work. The Court of Appeal for Saskatchewan had previously held that a similar back-to-work law was unconstitutional because it infringed workers' freedom of association. The government appealed that decision to the Supreme Court of Canada. Since the Court of Appeal decision was still the statement of law at the time of the SGEU Dispute Settlement Act, a clause was written into the act, invoking the section 33 override.Peter W. Hogg, Constitutional Law of Canada, 4th ed. (Scarborough: Carswell, 1997), s. 36.2. The earlier law was later found by the Supreme Court to be consistent with the Charter, meaning the use of the clause had been unnecessary.RWDSU v. Saskatchewan, [1987] 1 S.C.R. 460.

Catholic school funding (2018)
In May 2018, the Saskatchewan Legislature invoked the notwithstanding clause to overrule the Court of Queen's Bench ruling in Good Spirit School Division No 204 v Christ The Teacher Roman Catholic Separate School Division No 212'', 2017 SKQB 109, which stated the government could not provide funding for non-Catholic students to attend Catholic separate schools. The Saskatchewan Court of Appeal overturned the decision in March 2020, and the Supreme Court of Canada declined leave to appeal. With the original decision overturned, there was no longer a need for the Notwithstanding Clause.

Other discussions of its use in Saskatchewan

Following a Supreme Court of Canada decision of January 30, 2015, which struck down Saskatchewan essential service legislation, Premier Brad Wall publicly considered using the notwithstanding clause to protect the province's ability to force essential service employees back to work.

Yukon

Committee appointments (1982)
In 1982, the legislature of Yukon made use of the notwithstanding clause in the Land Planning and Development Act. This was the first use, by any Canadian legislature, of the section 33 override. However, as constitutional scholar Peter Hogg notes, the "statute ... was never brought into force and so scarcely counts as an example".

References

External links

 Centre for Constitutional Studies: Notwithstanding Clause Keyword
 Canadian Parliamentary Library paper on the Charter 
 Maple Leaf Web: Section 33: The Notwithstanding Clause
 CBC News In Depth: Canadian Government. Notwithstanding clause – FAQs (2005)

Section 33